Rainy Lake is a small lake in the Ottawa River and St. Lawrence River drainage basins in Addington Highlands, Lennox and Addington County, Ontario, Canada.

The primary outflow, at the northwest, is an unnamed creek to Northeast Lake, whose waters eventually flow via Snake Creek, the Madawaska River and the Ottawa River to the St. Lawrence River.

See also
List of lakes in Ontario

References

Lakes of Lennox and Addington County